Yisel Tejeda is a Dominican American journalist based in New York City.  Tejeda is currently the news anchor for WXTV-DT Univision 41 Nueva York's late night newscast Noticias Univision 41 Solo a las Once. Tejeda is also news anchor for daily digital Spanish-language news segments for Altice USA News 12 Networks.  Tejeda formally served as news anchor for Univision 41 Nueva York's morning newscast Al Despertar.

Early life and education

Tejeda was born and raised in Brooklyn, New York to Dominican parents.

Tejeda received a Bachelors of Arts degree in Radio - Television from the University of Central Florida (UCF) in Orlando, Florida.

Career

Upon graduating UCF, Tejeda joined the newscast of WVEA-TV Univision Tampa Bay as reporter and anchor.  At Univision Tampa Bay, she covered local and national news events such as the 2012 Republican National Convention and the 2012 Presidential Elections.

Tejeda subsequently worked as an anchor, reporter and producer for Infomás and Bay News 9, in Tampa, Florida.

Tejeda joined WXTV-DT Univision 41 Nueva York in 2015.  In 2018, Tejeda was named news anchor of WXTV-DT Univision 41 Nueva York’s morning newscast Al Despertar.  In September 2019, Tejeda was named news anchor of WXTV-DT Univision 41 Nueva York's re-launched late night newscast Noticias Univision 41 Solo a las Once.

In June 2021, Tejeda served as a panelist during the second debate of the Democratic Primary for the 2021 New York City mayoral election.

Awards and recognition

Tejeda is a four-time New York Emmy Awards winner:

 2018 New York Emmy Awards winner for Continuing Coverage.
 2018 New York Emmy Awards winner for Journalistic Enterprise.
 2019 New York Emmy Awards winner for Health/Science News.
 2020 New York Emmy Awards winner for Morning Newscast (Anchor).

In 2016, Tejeda was named Goodwill Ambassador of the Bronx Dominican Parade.

In 2021, Tejeda was recognized by the Dominican Consulate in New York as a woman who has transcended in various areas of knowledge and whose professional and social work have excelled abroad.

References 

Living people
Dominican-American culture in New York (state)
American women journalists
Univision people
University of Central Florida alumni
Year of birth missing (living people)
21st-century American women